William John Watkins (born 1942) is a science fiction writer and poet. 

In the 1970s and 1980s he was known for novels, but in the last decade he has primarily been a short story writer and poet. In 2002 he won the Rhysling Award for short poem for We Die as Angels.

Watkins was a professor of humanities and one of the founding faculty members of Brookdale Community College in New Jersey, from which he retired in 2008. His middle-name is commonly written as "Jon."

Bibliography

Books
 
 
 Clickwhistle (1973)
 The Litany of Sh'reev (1976) (with Gene Snyder)
 What Rough Beast (1980)
 The Centrifugal Rickshaw Dancer (1985) (Legrange League)
 Going to See the End of the Sky (1986) (Legrange League)
 The Last Deathship off Antares (1989)
 Cosmic Thunder (1996)

Poems

References

External links
Fantastic Fiction

1942 births
Living people
20th-century American novelists
20th-century American poets
20th-century American short story writers
American male novelists
American male poets
American male short story writers
American science fiction writers
Asimov's Science Fiction people
Brookdale Community College faculty
Rhysling Award for Best Short Poem winners
20th-century American male writers
Novelists from New Jersey